Levi Bellfield (born Levi Rabbetts; 17 May 1968) is an English serial killer, sex offender, rapist, kidnapper, and burglar. He was found guilty on 25 February 2008 of the murders of Marsha McDonnell and Amélie Delagrange and the attempted murder of Kate Sheedy, and sentenced to life imprisonment. On 23 June 2011, Bellfield was further found guilty of the murder of Milly Dowler.

On both occasions, the judge imposed a whole life order, meaning that Bellfield will serve the sentence without the possibility of parole. Bellfield is the only prisoner in history to have received two whole life orders.

Early life
Levi Bellfield was born at the West Middlesex Hospital, Isleworth, London, to Jean (née Bellfield) and Joseph Rabbetts; he is of Romani descent. When Bellfield was 10-years-old, his father died from leukaemia.

Bellfield and his siblings, Joelion, Harry, Josephine, and Maxine (two brothers and two sisters) were brought up on a southwest London council estate. He attended Forge Lane Junior School then Rectory Secondary School, Hampton, later moving to Feltham Community College.

Crimes
Bellfield's first conviction was for burglary in 1981. He was convicted of assaulting a police officer in 1990. He also has convictions for theft and driving offences. By 2002, Bellfield had nine convictions and had spent almost one year in prison for them.

In an interview with the media, Detective Chief Inspector Colin Sutton of the Metropolitan Police, who led the murder investigation, said of Bellfield: "When we started dealing with him he came across as very jokey, like he's your best mate. But he's a cunning individual, violent. He can switch from being nice to being nasty, instantly."

Bellfield searched for victims on streets he knew intimately. Detectives tracked down a number of ex-girlfriends, who all described a similar pattern of behaviour when they got involved with him. "He was lovely at first, charming, then completely controlling and evil. They all said the same," said Detective Sergeant Jo Brunt.

Modus operandi
At the time of the attacks, Bellfield ran a wheel-clamping business which operated in and around West Drayton, where he lived. Sutton speculated:

Bellfield was seen driving around in his van, talking to young girls at bus stops, while under police surveillance. Amélie Delagrange was seen by CCTV cameras which showed her walking towards Twickenham Green after she missed her stop on the bus home. She may have stopped and spoken to Bellfield between the last two sightings of her.  She was attacked shortly afterwards.

Arrest and charges

Bellfield was arrested early on the morning of 22 November 2004 on suspicion of the murder of Amélie Delagrange. On 25 November, he was charged with three counts of rape in Surrey and West London. On 9 December 2004, he was charged with assaulting a woman in Twickenham between 1995 and 1997 and remanded in custody. Bellfield was rearrested and charged with Delagrange's murder on 2 March 2006, along with the attempted murder of Kate Sheedy and the attempted murder and causing grievous bodily harm to Irma Dragoshi. On 25 May 2006, Bellfield was charged with the murder of Marsha McDonnell.

Victims

Milly Dowler

Amanda Jane "Milly" Dowler was a 13-year-old girl who went missing on leaving Walton-on-Thames railway station on 21 March 2002 and was found dead in Yateley Heath Woods, Yateley, six months later. In August 2009, Surrey Police submitted a dossier to the Crown Prosecution Service (CPS) containing evidence of Bellfield's involvement in the murder of Dowler. On 30 March 2010, Bellfield was charged with the kidnapping and murder of Dowler, as well as the attempted kidnapping of then 12-year-old Rachel Cowles on 20 March 2002. Bellfield did not give evidence at his trial and denied any involvement in Dowler's death. A jury convicted Bellfield of Milly Dowler's murder on 23 June 2011.

Marsha McDonnell
Marsha Louise McDonnell, a 19-year-old woman, was beaten over the head with a blunt instrument near her home in Hampton in February 2003. The wound was inflicted shortly after she got off the 111 bus from Kingston upon Thames at the stop on Percy Road. McDonnell died in hospital two days after being admitted. Bellfield sold his Vauxhall Corsa car for £1,500 six days after the murder, having bought it for £6,000 just five months earlier.

Kate Sheedy
Kate Sheedy, then aged 18, was deliberately run over as she crossed the road near an entrance to an industrial estate in Isleworth on 28 May 2004. She survived with multiple injuries and consequently spent several weeks in hospital. Nearly four years later, Sheedy gave evidence against Bellfield when he was tried for her attempted murder. Sheedy had described the car after the attack as a white people carrier with blacked out windows and a broken wing mirror; Bellfield was found to have owned a Toyota Previa matching that description at the time of the attack.

Amélie Delagrange
Amélie Delagrange was a 22-year-old French student visiting the UK. She was found at Twickenham Green on the evening of 19 August 2004 with serious head injuries, and died in hospital the same night. Within 24 hours, the police established that she might have been killed by the same person who had killed Marsha McDonnell 18 months earlier. Bellfield reportedly confessed to the murder while on remand.

Charges of abduction and attempted murder
Bellfield was also charged with the abduction and false imprisonment of Anna-Maria Rennie (then aged 17) in Whitton on 14 October 2001, after she identified him in a video identity parade four years later. He was also charged with the attempted murder of Irma Dragoshi (then aged 39) in Longford on 16 December 2003. The jury failed to reach verdicts on either of these charges.

Conviction and imprisonment
Bellfield was found guilty of the murders of McDonnell and Delagrange, as well as the attempted murder of Sheedy, on 25 February 2008, more than three years after the last of the three attacks. The following day, he was sentenced to life imprisonment with a whole life order. Bellfield was not in court to hear his sentence, as he had refused to attend court owing to "unfair press coverage" following his conviction.

On 30 March 2010, Bellfield was charged with Dowler's abduction and murder, pre-dating the earliest of the other three charges by almost a year. He was named as the prime suspect in connection with the murder in the immediate aftermath of his first trial in 2008. As a result, the inquest into Dowler's death was adjourned. On 6 October 2010, he appeared in court via video link and was formally charged with one count each of attempted abduction, (actual) abduction and murder.

Bellfield's second trial began at the Old Bailey on 10 May 2011 and on 23 June the jury found Bellfield guilty. He was again sentenced to life imprisonment the following day and the trial judge once again imposed a whole life order. The trial of Bellfield on another charge, that of the attempted abduction of an 11-year-old girl who was offered a lift in the Walton area by a man in a red car on the day preceding this murder, was abandoned due to newspapers publishing prejudicial material.

On 27 January 2016, Surrey Police announced that Bellfield had admitted, for the first time, abducting, raping and murdering Dowler after being interviewed about whether he had an accomplice. Bellfield later issued a denial that he made any such confession, but Surrey Police stood by their earlier statement. 

Levi Bellfield is imprisoned in HM Prison Frankland where he will spend the rest of his life.

Links to other crimes
After his February 2008 convictions, Bellfield was named by police as a suspect in connection with numerous unsolved murders and attacks on women dating back to 1980.

Murder of Patsy Morris

On 16 June 1980, Patsy Morris, a 14-year old schoolgirl from Feltham, London, was murdered by strangulation. She disappeared on the day of her death having been seen leaving her school during her lunch break. It was believed Morris left school because she had forgotten her rain coat that morning, choosing to return home to change into dry clothes.

Two days later, on the evening of 18 June, Morris's body was found by a police dog handler on Hounslow Heath. She was discovered face down in a copse beside a path on the edge of the Heath, at a location a quarter of a mile from her home in Cygnet Avenue. She was found fully-clothed. She had been strangled with a ligature. There were no signs of sexual assault.

In February 2008, police revealed they were investigating a possible confession to the murder made by Bellfield. He was said to have been obsessed with the murder when it occurred and remained 'fascinated' by the unsolved killing. Bellfield was alleged to have made the confession to a cellmate while on remand. It was then revealed that Bellfield had attended Feltham Comprehensive with Morris, and that he was her childhood boyfriend. Morris's family told the press that they had not known they had known each other, and her sister stated: "We did not know him. It was a shock when we found out they knew each other. Friends told us about it. It is horrendous."

Bellfield would have been 12-years-old at the time of Morris's murder, which occurred a year before he received his first conviction, for burglary, aged 13. He was known to have repeatedly played truant while at school and was known to often frequent Hounslow Heath when he should have been at school. He was known to have not attended school the day of the murder. Former partners of Bellfield recounted that he had a hatred of blonde women and targeted them for attacks, and it was noted that Morris was herself blonde. Some claimed that Morris's death could have been the start of Bellfield's violent obsession with blondes.

After it was revealed that Bellfield was being investigated by police for the murder of Patsy Morris, her father George Morris stated that he was certain that the teenage boy who had given him a death threat in a call at the time was Bellfield, saying: "He's a local man, which is why it could be him. And it's terrifying to think that someone of twelve or thirteen could have done it".

Murder of Judith Gold

After Bellfield's 2008 conviction, police revealed they were reviewing the murder of 51-year-old Judith Gold in Hampstead in October 1990. Described as an "attractive and vivacious" middle-class housewife, she had died yards from her home after being hit several times in the face by an unidentified weapon. Police believed Bellfield could have been responsible for this alongside around 20 other unsolved attacks on women in London. 

These attacks, which took place between 1990 and around 2004, were all linked to Bellfield because the police researched the frequency of blunt-force trauma attacks on women and children using objects such as hammers and found that they were so rare that only one unsolved attack in Greater London in that time period could not realistically be ruled out as being the work of Bellfield.

The circumstances of Gold's murder were somewhat mysterious: police were unsure why she had dressed as if for a business meeting just before she left her home at around 5:30am on the day she was killed, Saturday 20 October 1990. She left her home above the Midland Bank in Hampstead High Street and was found battered only yards away by a paperboy in Old Brewery Mews, while it was still pitch black. The place she was found was very dark due to recent problems with street lightings at that spot. Unusually, no witnesses reported hearing any screams, struggle or anything else suspicious, and her housemates reported having not heard her get up and leave for unexplained reasons in the middle of the night. Her husband had died two years previously and she lived with her 19-year-old daughter and her family friend.

Gold worked as an insurance and mortgage agent and also as a freelance financier, and was also known as Judith Silver. There was no sign of sexual assault and the motive also appeared not to be robbery as her handbag and jewellery were left untouched, although her very distinctive chain which she wore round her neck had been taken. The chain had been given to her by her new boyfriend, who she had met in Tenerife and who was 15 years younger than her.

In February 1991, The Guardian had reported that the murder was believed to be linked to an "international financial swindle". Scotland Yard detectives said at the time that they were investigating fraudulent loan schemes that Gold may have been involved in, and it was found that she was involved in an "international advanced-fee fraud". Gold did not usually wake up early and her job did not involve working on Saturdays, and so investigators theorised that she had arranged a meeting with someone and knew the killer. Her work was described as "shadowy" and involved negotiating large low-interest loans with businessmen, which her daughter disliked her doing and which she said made her mother visibly stressed in the days before she died. 

The lead detective on the case said in 1994: "We're sure she got in too deep and that's what led to her death." For unknown reasons it was found that Gold had written the number of the local police station on the back of her chequebook. The day before her murder, Gold had mysteriously left the house and her daughter noticed that her car had been reversed into its parking space when she returned, something she never did, raising the possibility she had gone to meet someone then and they had driven her car back home. In February 2022, it was reported that Bellfield had allegedly "confessed" to the murder of Gold.

Russell murders
Regarding the 1996 murders of Lin Russell and her daughter Megan, BBC Cymru Wales reported that Bellfield had allegedly confessed to the murders to a fellow prisoner, giving details that "would only be known by the killer". Bellfield denied the confession. A 2017 BBC Two programme, The Chillenden Murders, in which a team of independent experts re-examined the evidence, supported the idea Bellfield should be investigated for the killings. The legal team of Michael Stone, convicted of the crimes, maintains Bellfield is the true perpetrator of the attack. 

In December 2017, The Sunday Times reported that Bellfield's ex-wife Johanna Collings had told investigators in the Delagrange case that he was with her on the day for her 25th birthday, the time of the Russell murders, and had spent all day in Twickenham and Windsor, 100 miles away from the scene of the murders which occurred at around 4.30pm. It was an alibi which detectives found credible. Collings had helped detectives convict Bellfield for his previous murders, such as in the Milly Dowler murder, giving evidence that he knew the area well, where her body was left. In regards to the Russell murders, however, she clarified in a BBC documentary in 2017:

In February 2022 it was claimed by Stone's lawyer, Paul Bacon, that Bellfield had confessed to the murders of Lin and Megan Russell in a four-page statement with details he claimed only the killer would know. However, as well as his former wife previously saying it was not possible that he could have been in Kent on the day, a member of Stone's legal team also later admitted that there was nothing in Bellfield's statement which was not already in the public domain, suggesting he could have fabricated it using known evidence. The detective responsible for investigating Bellfield's known crimes, Colin Sutton, also stated to the press: "Knowing Bellfield as I do, this could be him playing mind games". The Metropolitan Police previously investigated allegations that Bellfield was involved in the Russell murders and found no evidence to support the claims.

Further developments
Police were informed in early 2015 that Bellfield, in his cell at HM Prison Wakefield, had admitted to unsolved rape and murder cases. The Metropolitan Police co-ordinated the subsequent investigations of ten police forces. On 9 November 2016, they issued a statement which said: "All lines of inquiry have now been exhausted and the decision has been taken to close this investigation as there is no evidence to link the individual to any case for which he has not already been convicted." It was later revealed by police that Bellfield may have lied about other murders so he could inflict pain on their families.

Personal life
Bellfield has fathered eleven children with five different women, the three youngest with his most recent girlfriend, Emma Mills. In May 2022 the Ministry of Justice confirmed that Bellfield was engaged and had applied to marry while in a prison. He proposed to a woman who had started writing to him two years previously, before becoming a visitor on a regular basis. Bellfield would need the permission of the governor at HM Prison Frankland.

In popular media
The investigation that led to Bellfield's arrest was dramatised by ITV in a three-part television series that premiered in early 2019; Manhunt was adapted from the memoir of Colin Sutton, with actor Martin Clunes playing Sutton.

The third episode of the eight-part series Making a Monster, commissioned by the Crime & Investigation channel, focuses on Levi Bellfield's character and motivations.

The Real Manhunter aired on Sky Crime in 2021 with the second episode exploring the Levi Bellfield investigation. Colin Sutton and his original team of Metropolitan Police detectives described everything from the moment Bellfield was identified through to his arrest, trial and conviction.

See also
List of serial killers in the United Kingdom
Murders of Eve Stratford and Lynne Weedon
David Smith – contemporary killer of women who also operated from south-west London
Murder of Alison Shaughnessy – when some of the charges against Bellfield were forced to be dropped in 2011 due to prejudicial reporting, it was compared to the Shaughnessy case
Colin Campbell – infamous 1980s killer and abductor of women in west London

References

Further reading

1968 births
20th-century English criminals
21st-century English criminals
British people convicted of attempted murder
British people convicted of burglary
British people convicted of kidnapping
British people convicted of theft
Converts to Islam
Criminals from London
English male criminals
English murderers of children
English Muslims
English people convicted of assault
English people convicted of murder
English prisoners sentenced to life imprisonment
English Romani people
English rapists
English serial killers
Living people
Male serial killers
People convicted of murder by England and Wales
People from Isleworth
Prisoners sentenced to life imprisonment by England and Wales
Romani criminals
Romani Muslims
Security guards convicted of crimes
Violence against women in England